Stonogobiops yasha, the Orange-striped shrimpgoby, is a species of goby native to the Western Pacific Ocean where it occurs at depths of from .  It inhabits sandy areas along the outer slopes of reefs where it lives in a commensal relationship with the shrimp Alpheus randalli.  This species can reach a length of  SL.

References

yasha
Fish described in 2001